The Kent & East Sussex Railway has hosted a variety of heritage rolling stock since the line was closed by British Railways in 1961.

Current stock

Steam locomotives

Diesel locomotives

Diesel Multiple Units(DMUs)

Passenger stock

Non-Passenger stock

Freight stock

Permanent way equipment

Former stock

Rolling stock which has previously operated on the Kent & East Sussex Railway.

Former Steam locomotives

Former Diesel locomotives

Former Railcars

Former Passenger stock

Former Non-Passenger stock

Former Freight Stock

Notes
Restriction '0' stock is 8 ft  in (2.46 m) wide and permitted to travel over the Hastings Line.

Sources
:

References

Kent and East Sussex Railway
History of East Sussex
History of Kent
Transport in the Borough of Ashford
Rail transport in Kent